Garin College is a New Zealand Catholic, integrated, co-educational day and boarding secondary school in Nelson on the northern outskirts of Richmond. The college opened on 28 January 2002 to serve the Catholic community, particularly in the upper South Island.

The college is named after Father Antoine Marie Garin (1810–1889) who was the founding pastor of the Catholic Church in Nelson. The proprietor of the school is the Catholic Archbishop of Wellington.

Houses

Garin College has four houses. The houses all have individual names and are represented by colours. Siblings enrolled at the college are often put in the same house.

 Aubert, Blue House
 Barbier, Green house
 MacKillop, Yellow house
 McAuley, Red house

Boarding hostels
The school has accommodation for up to 56 boarders from outlying areas in its boarding hostel, separated into two houses by gender: Francis Douglas House for male students; and Mother Teresa House for female students.

Haka

The college's haka was written and performed for the first time in 2006, four years after the school first opened. It was first unveiled to the school and spectators at the 2006 annual Te Wairua o nga Mahi Toi festival. It was the opening act on the 2006 final Mahi Toi night.

Principals
 John Boyce (2002-2015)
 John Maguire (2016-present)

Notable alumni
 Caleb Nott, member of music duo Broods
 Georgia Nott, lead vocals of music duo Broods
Anna Robinson, singer

References

Educational institutions established in 2002
Buildings and structures in Nelson, New Zealand
Secondary schools in Nelson, New Zealand
Catholic secondary schools in New Zealand
Boarding schools in New Zealand
2002 establishments in New Zealand
Richmond, New Zealand